The 2010–11 Montenegrin Second League is the fifth season since its establishment. The league played its first games of the season on August 14, 2010.

Format of competition
Twelve teams participate in this league. The top team directly qualifies for the Montenegrin First League while the second and third teams contest in a two matches playoff against the 11th and 12th team from the First League. The two bottom-placed teams are relegated to the Third League, to be replaced by the two winners of the Third League promotion play-off.

Teams

The following 12 clubs competed in this season.

League table

Results
The schedule consists of three rounds. During the first two rounds, each team played each other once home-and-away for a total of 22 games. The pairings of the third round were then set according to the standings after the first two rounds, giving every team a third game against each opponent for a total of 33 games per team.

First and second round

Third round

Promotion play-offs
The 3rd-placed team (against the 10th-placed team of the First League) and the runners-up (against the 11th-placed team of the First League) will both compete in two-legged promotion play-offs after the end of the season.

Summary

Matches

Sutjeska won 1–0 on aggregate.

1–1 on aggregate. Berane won on away goals.

References

External links
Season on soccerway.com

Montenegrin Second League seasons
2010–11 in Montenegrin football
Monte